Edward Norton Whiteaway (1 November 1928 – 18 October 1995) was a British racing driver from England, who raced from 1951 to 1963. His single World Championship Formula One entry was at the 1955 Monaco Grand Prix in his privately entered HWM, but he failed to qualify. He also competed in some non-Championship Formula One races.

At Le Mans in 1959 he teamed up with John Turner in Mrs. Waugh's ACE Bristol. They won the 2 litre class and came 7th overall.

Complete Formula One World Championship results 
(key)

Sources

All Formula One World Championship race results are taken from 

English racing drivers
English Formula One drivers
1928 births
1995 deaths
24 Hours of Le Mans drivers
World Sportscar Championship drivers